The 1898 Massachusetts Aggies football team represented Massachusetts Agricultural College in the 1898 college football season. The team was coached by David F. Weeks and played its home games at Alumni Field in Amherst, Massachusetts. Weeks became the first official head coach of the Aggies this campaign. Massachusetts finished the season with a record of 1–4–1.

Schedule

References

Massachusetts
UMass Minutemen football seasons
Massachusetts Aggies football